Hard systems is a problem-solving approach in systems science. It is opposing soft systems. Although soft systems thinking treats all problems as ill-defined or not easily quantified, hard systems approaches (systems analysis (structured methods), operations research and so on) assume that the problems associated with such systems are well-defined, they have a single, optimum solution, a scientific approach to problem-solving will work well, and that technical factors will tend to predominate.

Developments in hard systems thinking 
Hard systems began to emerge as a distinct philosophy in the 1950s.

See also 
Systems engineering
Systems analysis
Systems dynamics

References 

Systems theory